Live and Let Die is the soundtrack to the eighth James Bond film of the same name. It was scored by George Martin. The title song was written by Paul and Linda McCartney and performed by Paul McCartney and Wings.

It was the first Bond film score not to involve John Barry.

History
The music for most of the Bond films up until Diamonds Are Forever had been scored by John Barry. Due to his working on a musical, and having fallen out with Bond producer Harry Saltzman over the last title song, Barry was unavailable to score Live and Let Die.

Producers Saltzman and Albert Broccoli approached Paul McCartney to write the theme song and McCartney in turn asked Martin to record it for him. Impressed with the orchestration for the finished track, Saltzman and Broccoli considered Martin for the film's score.

Martin worked closely with director Guy Hamilton who described what the music should convey in each scene as it unfolds. Only very minor changes to the finished score were asked for. Martin felt that this was as much for Hamilton's accurate briefing.

The orchestra was conducted by Martin and recorded at AIR Studios. The soundtrack was also released in quadrophonic.

Title song

Having recorded McCartney's performance, Martin was taken aback when Saltzman asked him who he thought should sing the film's title song, suggesting to him Thelma Houston. Saltzman had envisaged a female soul singer. Martin said that it should be McCartney. The recording contract had specified that McCartney would "perform the title song under the opening titles".  Martin nonetheless scored a soul arrangement to accompany singer B. J. Arnau for a nightclub sequence in the film.

Live and Let Die was the first time that a rock music arrangement was used to open a Bond film.  It was also the first time that McCartney and Martin had worked together since Abbey Road in 1969. McCartney had been considered as title song composer for the previous Bond film, Diamonds Are Forever. The song was nominated for an Academy Award but lost to "The Way We Were".

The ″Live and Let Die" single was a major success in the U.S. and UK and continues to be a highlight of McCartney's live shows. Chrissie Hynde covered the song for Bond composer David Arnold's compilation album Shaken and Stirred: The David Arnold James Bond Project.

Track listing
The original soundtrack LP ended with track 14, James Bond theme, and this version was released on CD in 1988. The digitally remastered CD re-release, 2003, as well as adding eight additional tracks, extended several of the original ones, such as Bond Meets Solitaire. Except as noted, all tracks composed by George Martin.

 "Live and Let Die (Main Title) (Paul and Linda McCartney)" – Paul McCartney & Wings
 "Just a Closer Walk with Thee (Trad. Arr. Milton Batiste) /New Second Line (Milton Batiste)" – Harold A. "Duke" Dejan & The Olympia Brass Band
 "Bond Meets Solitaire"
 "Whisper Who Dares"
 "Snakes Alive"
 "Baron Samedi's Dance of Death"
 "San Monique"
 "Fillet of Soul – New Orleans/Live and Let Die/Fillet of Soul – Harlem" – B. J. Arnau
 "Bond Drops In"
 "If He Finds It, Kill Him"
 "Trespassers Will Be Eaten"
 "Solitaire Gets Her Cards"
 "Sacrifice"
 "James Bond Theme" (Monty Norman)
 "Gunbarrel/Snakebit"
 "Bond to New York"
 "San Monique (Alternate)"
 "Bond and Rosie"
 "The Lovers"
 "New Orleans"
 "Boat Chase"
 "Underground Lair"

See also
 Outline of James Bond

References

Soundtrack albums from James Bond films
Soundtrack
Albums produced by George Martin
1973 soundtrack albums
United Artists Records soundtracks
Albums conducted by George Martin
Albums arranged by George Martin